The 1996–97 Serie A title was won by Juventus, under head coach Marcello Lippi. Cagliari, Perugia, Hellas Verona and Reggiana were relegated.

Teams
Bologna, Hellas Verona, Perugia and Reggiana had been promoted from Serie B.

Events
Following the historical change of the UEFA Champions League entry list, Italy obtained a seventh place in Europe.

Number of teams by region

Personnel and Sponsoring

League table

Results

Relegation tie-breaker

Cagliari relegated to 1997-98 Serie B.

Top goalscorers

Footnotes

References and sources
Almanacco Illustrato del Calcio - La Storia 1898-2004, Panini Edizioni, Modena, September 2005

External links

 :it:Classifica calcio Serie A italiana 1997 - Italian version with pictures and info.
  - All results on RSSSF Website.
 1996/1997 Serie A Squads - (www.footballsquads.co.uk)

Serie A seasons
Italy
1996–97 in Italian football leagues